Yardangs are common in some regions on Mars, especially in the Medusae Fossae Formation. This formation is found in the Amazonis quadrangle and near the equator.  They are formed by the action of wind on sand sized particles; hence they often point in the prevailing direction that the winds were blowing when they were formed.  Because they exhibit very few impact craters they are believed to be relatively young.  The easily eroded nature of the Medusae Fossae Formation suggests that it is composed of weakly cemented particles, and was most likely formed by the deposition of wind-blown dust or volcanic ash. Yardangs are parts of rock that have been sand blasted into long, skinny ridges by bouncing sand particles blowing in the wind. Layers are seen in parts of the formation.  A resistant caprock on the top of yardangs has been observed in Viking, Mars Global Surveyor, and HiRISE photos.  Images from spacecraft show that they have different degrees of hardness probably because of significant variations in the physical properties, composition, particle size, and/or cementation.

See also
Climate of Mars
Geology of Mars
Yardang
Hyperboreae Undae

References 

Geology of Mars
Surface features of Mars